Flora Fabbri was a 19th-century Italian ballet dancer. She was trained by Carlo Blasis, and was one of his 'Les Pleiades', being the first among those to become internationally famous. Fabbri danced to acclaim in Italy and Paris, before her London debut at Drury Lane Theatre in 1845, dancing as Mazourka in the ballet The Devil to Pay.

One critic wrote "Drury Lane Theatre opened for the season... with a ballet of no particular merit, but worthy of notice for the excellent dancing of Mademoiselle Flora Fabbri. This young lady has more than confirmed the favourable impression of last season. Her manner is at once refined and spirited, singularly graceful and yet always joyous, and impulsive."

Of Fabbri's dancing, Blasis said "light, bounding, aerial, and fanciful in every motion." Fabbri danced at the Paris Opera during 1845 to 1851, and also toured in Italy and Germany. She was engaged at La Fenice in Venice also.

References 

19th-century births
19th-century deaths
19th-century Italian ballet dancers
Italian ballerinas
Paris Opera Ballet dancers
Year of birth missing
Year of death missing
Place of birth missing
Place of death missing